Hyalinobatrachium mondolfii is a species of frog in the family Centrolenidae from northern South America.

Distribution
Its distribution is poorly known but has two main areas: western Amazonian basin in Leticia in southeastern Colombia, Acre in western Brazil, and Pando Department in northern Bolivia, and the Guiana Shield region in Pará in northern Brazil, southern Suriname, Guyana, and Delta Amacuro and Monagas states in northeastern Venezuela. It is very similar to Hyalinobatrachium munozorum and Hyalinobatrachium ruedai, and it may be impossible to distinguish these species on the basis of morphological characteristics alone.

Description
Hyalinobatrachium mondolfii has snout that is rounded in dorsal and lateral view. The tympanumic membrane is not visible. The belly and parietal peritoneum are transparent, whereas pericardium is white with minute melanophores. The dorsum is green with small yellow dots and minute melanophores. The iris is golden and reticulated by dark spots. The hands and feet are yellow.

Habitat
Hyalinobatrachium mondolfii  is exclusively associated with riverbank vegetation.

References

mondolfii
Amphibians of Bolivia
Amphibians of Brazil
Amphibians of Colombia
Amphibians of Guyana
Amphibians of Suriname
Amphibians of Venezuela
Amphibians described in 2001
Taxa named by Josefa Celsa Señaris
Taxonomy articles created by Polbot
Taxa named by José Ayarzagüena